Tiết canh is a Vietnamese dish of raw blood pudding served with cooked meat in Northern Vietnam. Pork and duck are the most common animal used to create this raw blood pudding. The most popular is tiết canh vịt, made from freshly killed duck blood and duck meat.

Typical preparation
The freshly drawn blood is collected in a bowl, and prevented from premature coagulation (hãm huyết), by mixing it with some fish sauce of certain proportions, usually three to five soup spoons of fish sauce for one quart (approximately 1 liter) of blood. Finely chopped meat such as cooked duck innards (gizzards, for example) and duck meat are put in a shallow dish along with a sprinkling of crushed peanuts and chopped herbs such as Vietnamese coriander, mint, etc. The blood and fish sauce mixture is then diluted with some watery broth left from cooking the meat and/or gizzards to promote blood coagulation, then quickly poured into the prepared meat dish. The finished dish can be kept cool in the refrigerator, which allows the blood to maintain its coagulated state, when immediate consumption is not called for right away. If the dish is removed from the refrigerator and left to sit at room temperature for a while the blood will return to a liquid state.

Health risk
Raw pig's blood often contains swine bacteria, and ingesting them may cause severe bacterial infections. For example, a streptococcus bacterium infection may cause respiratory decline, blood contamination, and severe necrosis in arms and legs, and is potentially fatal. In Vietnam, there are reports of human casualties after eating raw blood pudding.

See also

 List of duck dishes
 Blood as food

References

External links

Photos of tiết canh by Tristan Savatier from Flickr

Vietnamese cuisine
Puddings
Blood dishes
Duck dishes
Pork dishes
Potentially dangerous food
Vietnamese words and phrases